Otospermophilus is a genus of ground squirrels in the family Sciuridae, containing three species from Mexico and the United States. Otospermophilus was formerly placed in the large ground squirrel genus Spermophilus, as a subgenus or species group. Since DNA sequencing of the cytochrome b gene has shown Spermophilus to be paraphyletic to the prairie dogs and marmots, it is now separated, along with six other genera.

Species 
The three species in Otospermophilus are listed below. These are the same species that were previously grouped in the subgenus Otospermophilus.

 Baja California rock squirrel, Otospermophilus atricapillus
 California ground squirrel, Otospermophilus beecheyi
 Rock squirrel, Otospermophilus variegatus

References

External links 

 
Rodents of North America
Rodent genera
Taxa named by Johann Friedrich von Brandt